James Tagell (17 December 1914 – 1 December 1973) was an Australian rules footballer who played with Fitzroy in the Victorian Football League (VFL).

Tagell later served in the Australian Army during World War II.

Notes

External links 

1914 births
1973 deaths
Australian rules footballers from Victoria (Australia)
Fitzroy Football Club players